The 2015 VMI Keydets football team represented the Virginia Military Institute in the 2015 NCAA Division I FCS football season. It was VMI's 125th football season and the Keydets were led by first year head coach Scott Wachenheim. They played their home games at 10,000–seat Alumni Memorial Field at Foster Stadium, as they have since 1962. This was VMI's second season as a member of the Southern Conference, following 11 seasons in the Big South Conference, which followed 78 years in the Southern Conference. They finished the season 2–9, 1–6 in SoCon play to finish in last place.

Personnel

Coaching staff
VMI will be led by first-year head coach Scott Wachenheim, a native of California and a 1984 graduate of the United States Air Force Academy. Wachenheim was previously the offensive line coach at Virginia under head coach Mike London. He replaces Sparky Woods, who compiled a 17–62 record in seven seasons at VMI. Shortly following a home loss to The Citadel, VMI chose not to renew Woods' contract, and several weeks later announced the hire of Wachenheim.

Wachenheim introduced an almost entirely new coaching staff his first year on post. Coordinating the offense is Dustin Ward, while the defensive coordinator is Tom Clark who served two stints at William & Mary as a defensive coordinator and defensive backs coach. There were only two holdovers from Woods' staff: wide receivers and tight ends coach Brad Robbins, and linebackers coach Justin Hamilton, a 2006 graduate of Virginia Tech. Also new to the staff is running backs coach Tim Maypray, who played football at VMI and graduated in 2010 before a brief stint in the Canadian Football League.

Returning starters

Offense

Defense

Special teams

Roster

Projected depth chart

Schedule
VMI released its schedule on February 3, 2015. The schedule features six home games and five road contests. VMI will face Ball State on the road in the season opener on a Thursday night. The home opener will be September 12 against Pioneer League member Morehead State. The Keydets will play one team from the commonwealth of Virginia, Richmond, after not playing a team from Virginia in 2014. VMI will host conference rivals Samford, Chattanooga, Wofford, and Western Carolina, and will travel to Furman, Mercer, and The Citadel.

Source: Schedule

Game summaries

Ball State

Morehead State

Richmond

Furman

Bucknell

Samford

Chattanooga

Mercer

Wofford

The Citadel

Western Carolina

References

VMI
VMI Keydets football seasons
VMI Keydets football